Tautoro is a locality about 8 km south-southeast of Kaikohe in Northland, New Zealand. Further to the south is the Awarua rural community.

History and culture

Tautoro has Ngāpuhi marae:

 Kaikou Marae and Eparaima Makapi meeting house are affiliated with Ngāti Hine.
 Kaingahoa Mataraua Marae and Tūmanako meeting house are affiliated with Ngāi Tāwake ki te Waoku and Ngāti Rangi.
 Te Maata Marae and Te Whare Huinga are connected to Ngāti Moerewa and Ngāti Rangi.
 Te Rīngi and Māhūhū ki te Rangi meeting house are affiliated with Ngāti Moerewa.
 Māhūhū ki te Rangi Marae and meeting house belong to Ngāti Moerewa.
 Te Hungāiti is also a meeting ground for both hapū.

In October 2020, the Government committed $90,424 from the Provincial Growth Fund to upgrade Te Maata Marae and Te Kotahitanga Marae, creating 12 jobs.

The Awarua community has two Ngāpuhi marae:

 Te Hūruhi Marae and Ngāti Māhia meeting house are affiliated with Ngāti Hine and Ngāti Māhia
 Ururangi Marae and meeting house are affiliated with Ngāti Māhia

Demographics
The SA1 area is part of the larger Mataraua Forest statistical area.

The SA1 statistical area had a population of 210 at the 2018 New Zealand census, a decrease of 3 people (−1.4%) since the 2013 census, and an increase of 21 people (11.1%) since the 2006 census. There were 72 households, comprising 93 males and 117 females, giving a sex ratio of 0.79 males per female. The median age was 35.3 years (compared with 37.4 years nationally), with 57 people (27.1%) aged under 15 years, 33 (15.7%) aged 15 to 29, 99 (47.1%) aged 30 to 64, and 21 (10.0%) aged 65 or older.

Ethnicities were 37.1% European/Pākehā, 77.1% Māori, 8.6% Pacific peoples, 1.4% Asian, and 1.4% other ethnicities. People may identify with more than one ethnicity.

Although some people chose not to answer the census's question about religious affiliation, 41.4% had no religion, 41.4% were Christian, 5.7% had Māori religious beliefs and 1.4% were Muslim.

Of those at least 15 years old, 21 (13.7%) people had a bachelor's or higher degree, and 30 (19.6%) people had no formal qualifications. The median income was $19,100, compared with $31,800 nationally. 15 people (9.8%) earned over $70,000 compared to 17.2% nationally. The employment status of those at least 15 was that 57 (37.3%) people were employed full-time, 18 (11.8%) were part-time, and 21 (13.7%) were unemployed.

Mataraua Forest statistical area

Mataraua Forest had a population of 507 at the 2018 New Zealand census, an increase of 30 people (6.3%) since the 2013 census, and a decrease of 39 people (−7.1%) since the 2006 census. There were 168 households, comprising 246 males and 261 females, giving a sex ratio of 0.94 males per female. The median age was 36.5 years (compared with 37.4 years nationally), with 129 people (25.4%) aged under 15 years, 93 (18.3%) aged 15 to 29, 231 (45.6%) aged 30 to 64, and 57 (11.2%) aged 65 or older.

Ethnicities were 45.0% European/Pākehā, 70.4% Māori, 5.3% Pacific peoples, 2.4% Asian, and 1.2% other ethnicities. People may identify with more than one ethnicity.

The percentage of people born overseas was 6.5, compared with 27.1% nationally.

Although some people chose not to answer the census's question about religious affiliation, 42.6% had no religion, 43.2% were Christian, 2.4% had Māori religious beliefs, 0.6% were Muslim, 0.6% were Buddhist and 1.2% had other religions.

Of those at least 15 years old, 42 (11.1%) people had a bachelor's or higher degree, and 84 (22.2%) people had no formal qualifications. The median income was $19,700, compared with $31,800 nationally. 27 people (7.1%) earned over $70,000 compared to 17.2% nationally. The employment status of those at least 15 was that 150 (39.7%) people were employed full-time, 51 (13.5%) were part-time, and 24 (6.3%) were unemployed.

Education
Tautoro School is a coeducational full primary (years 1-8) school with a roll of  students as of 

The school celebrated its centenary in 2006. It was originally called Tautoro Native School.

Notes

Far North District
Populated places in the Northland Region